Epichilo obscurefasciellus is a moth in the family Crambidae. It was described by Joseph de Joannis in 1927. It is found in Mozambique.

References

Endemic fauna of Mozambique
Crambinae
Moths described in 1927
Moths of Sub-Saharan Africa
Lepidoptera of Mozambique